The 15th annual Four Hills Tournament was won by Norwegian athlete Bjørn Wirkola who secured three dominating victories after a surprising double victory for the East German team in Oberstdorf.

Participating nations and athletes

The national groups of Germany and Austria only competed at the two events in their respective countries.

Results

Oberstdorf
 Schattenbergschanze, Oberstdorf
30 December 1966

Garmisch-Partenkirchen
 Große Olympiaschanze, Garmisch-Partenkirchen
01 January 1967

Innsbruck
 Bergiselschanze, Innsbruck
6 December 1967

Bischofshofen
 Paul-Ausserleitner-Schanze, Bischofshofen
08 January 1967

Final ranking

References

External links
 FIS website
 Four Hills Tournament web site

Four Hills Tournament
1966 in ski jumping
1967 in ski jumping